Lepidoptera of Cape Verde represent about 280 known species. A total of 252 moth species have been recorded. Twenty-eight species of butterflies are known from Cape Verde, one of which is endemic. The moths (mostly nocturnal) and butterflies (mostly diurnal) together make up the taxonomic order Lepidoptera.

Butterflies

Hesperiidae
Borbo borbonica (Boisduval, 1833)
Coeliades forestan (Stoll, 1782)

Lycaenidae

Azanus jesous (Guérin, 1847)
Azanus mirza (Plötz, 1880) (questionable)
Azanus moriqua (Wallengren, 1857)
Chilades evorae Libert, Baliteau & Baliteau, 2011
Deudorix dinomenes Grose-Smith, 1887 (questionable)
Euchrysops osiris (Hopffer, 1855)
Lampides boeticus (Linnaeus, 1767)
Leptotes pirithous (Linnaeus, 1767)
Tarucus (Fabricius, 1793)
Zizeeria knysna (Trimen, 1862)

Nymphalidae

Byblia ilithyia (Drury, 1773)
Danaus chrysippus (Cramer, 1777)
Nymphalis polychloros (Linnaeus, 1758)
Hypolimnas misippus(Linnaeus, 1764)
Junonia oenone (Linnaeus, 1758)
Vanessa atalanta (Linnaeus, 1758)
Vanessa vulcania (Godart, 1819)
Vanessa cardui (Linnaeus, 1758)

Papilionidae
Papilio demodocus Esper, 1798

Pieridae

Belenois creona (Cramer, 1776) (questionable)
Catopsilia florella (Fabricius, 1775)
Colias croceus (Geoffroy in Fourcroy, 1785)
Colotis amata (Fabricius, 1775) (questionable)
Colotis euippe (Linnaeus, 1758) (questionable)
Eurema brigitta (Cramer, 1780)
Eurema floricola (Boisduval, 1833) (questionable)
Eurema hecabe (Linnaeus, 1758)
Eurema senegalensis (Boisduval, 1836) (questionable)
Pontia daplidice (Linnaeus, 1758)
Pontia glauconome Klug, 1829

Satyrinae
Melanitis leda (Linnaeus, 1758)

Moths

Bedelliidae
Bedellia somnulentella (Zeller, 1847)

Coleophoridae
Coleophora creola Baldizzone & van der Wolf, 2015

Cosmopterigidae
Anatrachyntis simplex (Walsingham, 1891)
Cosmopterix attenuatella (Walker, 1864)

Crambidae

Achyra coelatalis (Walker, 1859)
Achyra nudalis (Hübner, 1796)
Cataonia mauritanica Amsel, 1953
Condylorrhiza zyphalis (Viette, 1958)
Cornifrons ulceratalis Lederer, 1858
Cynaeda dentalis (Denis & Schiffermüller, 1775)
Diaphania indica (Saunders, 1851)
Duponchelia fovealis Zeller, 1847
Euclasta insularis Viette, 1958
Eudonia fogoalis Derra, 2008
Eudonia lindbergalis Viette, 1958
Hellula undalis (Fabricius, 1781)
Herpetogramma licarsisalis (Walker, 1859)
Hydriris ornatalis (Duponchel, 1832)
Cnaphalocrocis poeyalis (Boisduval, 1833)
Maruca vitrata (Fabricius, 1787)
Nomophila noctuella (Denis & Schiffermüller, 1775
Notarcha quaternalis (Zeller, 1852)
Omiodes indicata (Fabricius, 1775)
Orphanostigma abruptalis (Walker, 1859)
Palpita vitrealis (Rossi, 1794)
Pediasia strenua Bassi, 1992
Spoladea recurvalis (Fabricius, 1775)
Udea ferrugalis (Hübner, 1796)

Depressariidae
Ethmia quadrinotella (Mann, 1861)

Erebidae

Acantholipes aurea Berio, 1966
Acantholipes trimeni Felder & Rogenhofer, 1875
Achaea finita (Guenée, 1852)
Achaea infinita (Guenée, 1852)
Achaea violaceofascia (Saalmüller, 1891)
Anomis auragoides (Guenée, 1852)
Anomis flava (Fabricius, 1775)
Anticarsia rubricans (Boisduval, 1833)
Asota speciosa (Drury, 1773)
Audea melaleuca Walker, 1865
Crypsotidia maculifera (Staudinger, 1898)
Crypsotidia mesosema Hampson, 1913
Crypsotidia remanei Wiltshire, 1977
Dysgonia algira (Linnaeus, 1767)
Dysgonia angularis (Boisduval, 1833)
Dysgonia torrida (Guenée, 1852)
Eilema aistleitneri Cerny, 2013
Ericeia congregata (Walker, 1858)
Ericeia inangulata (Guenée, 1852)
Eublemma apicimacula (Mabille, 1880)
Eublemma baccatrix Hacker, 2019
Eublemma cochylioides (Guenée, 1852)
Eublemma ecthaemata Hampson, 1896
Eublemma exigua (Walker, 1858)
Eublemma gayneri (Rothschild, 1901)
Eublemma mesophaea Hampson, 1910
Eublemma parva (Hübner, 1808)
Eublemma scitula (Rambur, 1833)
Eublemma spirogramma Rebel, 1912
Gesoniodes nigripalpa (Wiltshire, 1977)
Gnamptonyx innexa (Walker, 1858)
Grammodes congenita Walker, 1858
Grammodes exclusiva Pagenstecher, 1907
Grammodes stolida (Fabricius, 1775)
Hipoepa fractalis (Guenée, 1854)
Hypena abyssinialis Guenée, 1854
Hypena conscitalis Walker, 1866
Hypena laceratalis Walker, 1859
Hypena lividalis (Hübner, 1790)
Hypena semilutea (Snellen, 1872)
Hypena strigatus (Fabricius, 1798)
Hypena varialis Walker, 1866
Janseodes melanospila (Guenée, 1852)
Lygephila pastinum (Treitschke, 1826)
Maxera marchalii (Boisduval, 1833)
Maxera nigriceps (Walker, 1858)
Mesogenea varians Hampson, 1902
Mocis conveniens (Walker, 1858)
Mocis mayeri (Boisduval, 1833)
Mocis proverai Zilli, 2000
Nodaria externalis Guenée, 1854
Ophiusa tirhaca (Cramer, 1777)
Oraesia intrusa (Krüger, 1939)
Pandesma robusta (Walker, 1858)
Pericyma mendax (Walker, 1858)
Phytometra melanosticta Hacker, 2016
Polydesma umbricola Boisduval, 1833
Serrodes partita (Fabricius, 1775)
Simplicia extinctalis (Zeller, 1852)
Sphingomorpha chlorea (Cramer, 1777)
Tathorhynchus exsiccata (Lederer, 1855)
Tathorhynchus leucobasis Bethune-Baker, 1911
Tathorhynchus troberti (Guenée, 1852)
Trigonodes hyppasia (Cramer, 1779)
Ulotrichopus primulina (Hampson, 1902)
Utetheisa pulchella (Linnaeus, 1758)

Gelechiidae

Anarsia balioneura Meyrick, 1921
Aristotelia benedenii (Weyenbergh, 1873)
Brachmia convolvuli (Walsingham, 1907)
Helcystogramma lamprostoma (Zeller, 1847)
Ornativalva heluanensis (Debski, 1913)
Pectinophora gossypiella (Saunders, 1844)
Phthorimaea operculella (Zeller, 1873)
Scrobipalpa aptatella (Walker, 1864)
Zizyphia cleodorella Chrétien, 1908

Geometridae

Chiasmia sudanata (Warren & Rothschild, 1905)
Comibaena leucospilata (Walker, 1863)
Comostolopsis stillata (Felder & Rogenhofer, 1875)
Eucrostes beatificata (Walker, 1863)
Eucrostes disparata Walker, 1861
Gymnoscelis daniloi Hausmann, 2009
Gymnoscelis lindbergi Herbulot, 1957
Isturgia catalaunaria (Guenée, 1858)
Isturgia deerraria (Walker, 1861)
Mesocolpia nanula (Mabille, 1900)
Microloxia aistleitneri Hausmann, 2009
Microloxia herbaria (Hübner, 1818)
Microloxia ruficornis Warren, 1897
Orthonama obstipata (Fabricius, 1794)
Pasiphila derasata (Bastelberger, 1905)
Phaiogramma faustinata (Millière, 1868)
Pingasa hypoleucaria (Guenée, 1862)
Pingasa lahayei (Oberthür, 1887)
Pingasa rhadamaria (Guenée, 1858)
Prasinocyma germinaria (Guenée, 1857)
Scopula minorata (Boisduval, 1833)
Scopula paneliusi Herbulot, 1957
Scopula retracta (Hausmann, 2006)
Thalassodes quadraria Guenée, 1858
Traminda vividaria (Walker, 1861)

Gracillariidae
Caloptilia soyella (van Deventer, 1904)
Phodoryctis caerulea (Meyrick, 1912)

Noctuidae

Acontia basifera Walker, 1857
Acontia conifrons Aurivillius, 1879
Acontia feae (Berio, 1937)
Acontia gratiosa Wallengren, 1856
Acontia imitatrix Wallengren, 1856
Acontia insocia (Walker, 1858)
Acontia opalinoides Guenée, 1852
Adisura callima Bethune-Baker, 1911
Agrotis aistleitneri Behounek & Speidel, 2009
Agrotis ipsilon (Hufnagel, 1766)
Agrotis segetum (Denis & Schiffermüller, 1775)
Agrotis spinifera (Hübner, 1808)
Agrotis subspinifera (Hampson, 1903)
Agrotis trux (Hübner, 1824)
Amyna axis Guenée, 1852
Anarta trifolii (Hufnagel, 1766)
Androlymnia clavata Hampson, 1910
Asplenia melanodonta (Hampson, 1896)
Athetis ochreosignata Aurivillius, 1910
Athetis pigra (Guenée, 1852)
Callopistria latreillei (Duponchel, 1827)
Callopistria maillardi (Guenée, 1862)
Caradrina clavipalpis (Scopoli, 1763)
Caradrina flava Oberthür, 1876
Chasmina tibialis (Fabricius, 1775)
Chasmina vestae (Guenée, 1852)
Chrysodeixis acuta (Walker, 1858)
Chrysodeixis chalcites (Esper, 1798)
Condica capensis (Guenée, 1852)
Condica conducta (Walker, 1857)
Condica pauperata (Walker, 1858)
Cornutiplusia circumflexa (Linnaeus, 1767)
Ctenoplusia limbirena (Guenée, 1852)
Euxoa admirabilis Hacker & Schreier, 2010
Euxoa canariensis Rebel, 1902
Haplocestra similis Aurivillius, 1910
Helicoverpa armigera (Hübner, 1808)
Helicoverpa assulta (Guenée, 1852)
Heliocheilus confertissima (Walker, 1865)
Heliothis nubigera Herrich-Schäffer, 1851
Heliothis peltigera (Denis & Schiffermüller, 1775)
Hiccoda pluristriata (Berio, 1937)
Iambiodes incerta (Rothschild, 1913)
Leucania loreyi (Duponchel, 1827)
Maliattha sahelica Hacker, 2016
Maliattha signifera (Walker, 1857)
Mythimna languida (Walker, 1858)
Mythimna natalensis (Butler, 1875)
Mythimna poliastis (Hampson, 1902)
Mythimna umbrigera (Saalmüller, 1891)
Mythimna vilis (Gaede, 1916)
Oederemia simplivalva Hacker & Schreier, 2010
Ozarba adducta Berio, 1940
Ozarba exoplaga Berio, 1940
Ozarba phlebitis Hampson, 1910
Ozarba rubrivena Hampson, 1910
Pardoxia graellsii (Feisthamel, 1837)
Peridroma saucia (Hübner, 1808)
Pseudozarba bipartita (Herrich-Schäffer, 1850)
Pseudozarba expatriata (Hampson, 1914)
Pseudozarba opella (Swinhoe, 1885)
Saalmuellerana media (Walker, 1857)
Sesamia calamistis Hampson, 1910
Sesamia nonagrioides (Lefèbvre, 1827)
Spodoptera exempta (Walker, 1857)
Spodoptera exigua (Hübner, 1808)
Spodoptera littoralis (Boisduval, 1833)
Thysanoplusia orichalcea (Fabricius, 1775)
Trichoplusia ni (Hübner, 1803)
Vittaplusia vittata (Wallengren, 1856)
Xanthodes albago (Fabricius, 1794)

Nolidae
Earias biplaga Walker, 1866
Earias cupreoviridis (Walker, 1862)
Earias insulana (Boisduval, 1833)
Pardasena virgulana (Mabille, 1880)

Plutellidae
Plutella xylostella (Linnaeus, 1758)

Praydidae
Prays citri (Millière, 1873)

Pterophoridae

Agdistis bifurcatus Agenjo, 1952
Agdistis notabilis Gielis & Karsholt, 2009
Agdistis tamaricis (Zeller, 1847)
Exelastis atomosa (Walsingham, 1885)
Exelastis pumilio (Zeller, 1873)
Hellinsia aistleitneri Arenberger, 2006
Lantanophaga pusillidactylus (Walker, 1864)
Megalorhipida leucodactylus (Fabricius, 1794)
Sphenarches anisodactylus (Walker, 1864)
Stenoptilodes taprobanes (Felder & Rogenhofer, 1875)

Pyralidae

Cadra figulilella (Gregson, 1871)
Corcyra cephalonica (Stainton, 1866)
Cryptoblabes gnidiella (Millière, 1867)
Ephestia elutella (Hübner, 1796)
Etiella zinckenella (Treitschke, 1832)
Galleria mellonella (Linnaeus, 1758)
Phycita pachylepidella Hampson, 1896
Plodia interpunctella (Hübner, 1813)
Susia uberalis (Swinhoe, 1884)
Thylacoptila paurosema Meyrick, 1885

Scythrididae
Eretmocera basistrigata Walsingham, 1889
Eretmocera laetissima Zeller, 1852
Scythris fissurella Bengtsson, 1997

Sphingidae

Acherontia atropos (Linnaeus, 1758)
Agrius cingulata (Fabricius, 1775)
Agrius convolvuli (Linnaeus, 1758)
Basiothia medea (Fabricius, 1781)
Daphnis nerii (Linnaeus, 1758)
Hippotion celerio (Linnaeus, 1758)
Hyles euphorbiae (Linnaeus, 1758)
Hyles livornica (Esper, 1780)
Hyles tithymali (Boisduval, 1834)
Nephele accentifera (Palisot de Beauvois, 1821)

Tineidae
Opogona sacchari (Bojer, 1856)

Tortricidae

Ancylis lutescens Meyrick, 1912
Coniostola stereoma (Meyrick, 1912)
Cydia choleropa (Meyrick, 1913)
Eccopsis praecedens Walsingham, 1897
Eccopsis wahlbergiana Zeller, 1852
Fulcrifera boavistae Razowski, 2015
Strepsicrates rhothia (Meyrick, 1910)
Thaumatotibia leucotreta (Meyrick, 1913)

References

B

Lepidoptera
Cape Verde
Cape Verde
Cape Verde